Wilhelmine Sophie Elizabeth Witte (born Böttcher, 17 November 1777 - 17 September 1854) was a German amateur astronomer. Böttcher was born in 1777 in Hanover, as daughter of Johanne Sophie Marie, born Brinkmann (5 January 1755 - 25 November 1824) and of senator Gottfried Ernst Böttcher (16 February 1750 - 17 October 1823). She married privy councilor Friedrich Christian Witte (1773-1854) on 17 November 1797  and they had 14 children, among which Minna Witte, Theodor Witte and Friedrich Ernst Witte.

She was interested in Astronomy and bought her first telescope in 1815 (a Fraunhofer-Refrakter, the best telescope in the market at that time). She used this together with the existing maps (by Johann Heinrich von Mädler) of the moon's surface to develop a terrain model of the moon. Her globe, with a diameter of 34 centimeters, was presented by Mädler in 1839 in Bad Pyrmont at a congress and can be seen today at the Historisches Museum Hannover. One year before, she presented a draft version to the Astronomer John Herschel. In 1840, she presented the globe to scientists and members of the Prussian royal household. It was afterwards bought by the royal family. In 1844, Witte prepared a new version of the globe which was presented by Herschel to the Society for the Advancement of Science at Cambridge.

In 2006 the IAU named the Venusian patera "" after her in honor of her exploits in mapping the topography of the moon. In 2011, a street in the district Kirchrode of Hanover was named after her.

References 

Selenographers
1777 births
1854 deaths
19th-century German women scientists
19th-century German astronomers
18th-century German astronomers